Sociaal-Liberale Partij (SLP; Dutch for Social Liberal Party) was a Belgian Flemish political party formed after dissolution of the moderate nationalist People's Union (Volksunie) party. Prior to 19 April 2008 it was known as Spirit, and intermediately as Flemish Progressives (VlaamsProgressieven). The party merged with Groen in the end of 2009, ceasing to exist.

History 
The People's Union split up into two parties, the social liberal Spirit and the centre-right New-Flemish Alliance (N-VA), which formed an electoral alliance with the Christian Democratic and Flemish (CD&V) party. The formation of the alliances was seen as a way in which Spirit and N-VA could guarantee their influence and position in Flemish and Belgian politics. This led the liberal wing to initially opt for an Alliance with Flemish Liberals and Democrats.

Abbreviation
Spirit was the abbreviation for 
Sociaal (Social)
Progressief (Progressive)
Internationaal (International)
Regionalistisch (Regional)
Integraal-democratisch (Completely democratic)
Toekomstgericht (Future oriented)

2007 elections

In the 10 June 2007 general elections, the Social Liberal party was in an electoral alliance with Socialist Party Different (sp.a) and won 14 out of 88 Flemish seats in the Chamber of Representatives and 4 out of 40 Flemish seats in the Senate.

In the autumn of 2008, following a scandal causing its leader, Bettina Geysen to step down, the Social Liberal Party ended its cooperation with SP.A. Geert Lambert was elected the new leader. Many prominent party members, including cofounder Bert Anciaux, left the party.

See also
L² - The youth organization of Vl.Pro

References

External links

Defunct political parties in Belgium
Flemish Movement
Flemish political parties in Belgium
Green liberalism
Social liberal parties
Political parties disestablished in 2009
2009 disestablishments in Belgium